CAPAC may refer to:

 Congressional Asian Pacific American Caucus, U.S. Congressional Caucus
 Congressional Asian Pacific American Caucus Leadership PAC, Political Action Committee
 Capac, Michigan
 Composers, Authors and Publishers Association of Canada